The 203mm/55 Modèle 1931 gun was a medium naval gun of the French Navy.These guns used the same ammunition as the 203mm/50 Modèle 1924 gun and were very similar except for the longer bore. It is believed that the guns were built from tubes of the older 240mm/50 Modèle 1902 guns.

Although commonly described as being used as the main battery of the heavy cruiser Algérie, mounted in four twin turrets, Algérie in fact used the same 203mm/50 Modèle 1924 as the rest of the French heavy cruisers.

In fact as written in French Cruisers 1922 - 1956 these guns did not exist.

References

External links 
 PIECES LOURDES: 240 et plus
 French 203 mm/55 (8") Model 1931

Bibliography 

Naval guns of France
World War II naval weapons
203 mm artillery